The Pakistan CLP class locomotive was a class of diesel locomotives operated by Pakistan Railways between 1955 and 1985.

History
In 1953, the Government of Australia funded the construction of nine Electro-Motive Diesel ML3 diesel locomotives by Clyde Engineering, Sydney for the Pakistan Railways under the Colombo Plan. These locomotives are derived from GM Class loco. All were withdrawn in 1984/85.

Class list

References

Clyde Engineering locomotives
Co-Co locomotives
Diesel locomotives of Pakistan
Railway locomotives introduced in 1955